Arise & Conquer is the fourth full-length album by Christian metal band War of Ages. The album was released on July 22, 2008 by Facedown Records. The album was produced by Tim Lambesis of As I Lay Dying. The band has released a one-minute clip of "Sleep of Prisoners" on their MySpace, as well as the song "Through the Flames".

Track listing

Personnel

War of Ages
 Leroy Hamp – lead vocals
 Steve Brown – lead guitar, backing vocals 
 Branon Bernatowicz – rhythm guitar, backing vocals 
 T.J. Alford – bass guitar, backing vocals
 Alex Hamp – drums

Production
 Dave Quiggle - artwork

References

2008 albums
War of Ages albums
Facedown Records albums